Pokémon The Series: XY is the seventeenth season of the Pokemon animated series and the first and titular season of Pokémon The Series: XY, known in Japan as . It is the first dubbed season to use the "Pokémon The Series" branding and as such can be a starting point. The season follows the continuing adventures of Ash Ketchum and Pikachu as they explore the Kalos region. Traveling in the Kalos region with their new friends - Clemont and his little sister Bonnie, along with Ash's childhood friend Serena - the party discover new Pokémon and the mysterious Mega Evolutions.

The season originally aired in Japan from October 17, 2013, to October 30, 2014, on TV Tokyo, and in the United States from January 18, 2014, to December 20, 2014, on Cartoon Network, after a preview of the first two episodes on October 19, 2013. In India, Pokémon XY is first aired on Hungama TV on May 9, 2015 in Hindi dub. But, some episodes are not aired on Hungama TV. Later, remaining episodes are dub in Hindi and this season is reaired on Marvel HQ (Now, known as Super Hungama) on March 20, 2021. This show began premiering on Pokémon Asia Official (Hindi) YouTube Channel from 30th September in hindi dubbed. 

The ending songs are  performed by J☆Dee'Z for 28 episodes,  performed by J☆Dee'Z with Pikachu (Ikue Ōtani) for 18 episodes,  "DreamDream" (ドリドリ DoriDori) performed by Shoko Nakagawa for 3 episodes, and the English opening song is "Pokémon Theme (Version XY)", performed by Ben Dixon and The Sad Truth. Its instrumental version serves as the ending theme.



Episode list

Home media releases 
Viz Media and Warner Home Video have released the series in the United States on two three-disc volume sets that contain 24 episodes each.

The first volume was released on August 4, 2015, and the second was released on January 19, 2016.

Notes

References

External links 
 Pokémon anime website at TV Tokyo 
 Pokémon XY page at Pokémon JP official website 
 Pokémon TV Anime at Pokémon JP official website 

2013 Japanese television seasons
2014 Japanese television seasons
Season17